Hokkai Maru (Japanese: 北海丸) was a rescue tug of the Imperial Japanese Army during World War II.

History
Hokkai Maru was laid down on 6 November 1941 by Osaka Iron Works Co., Ltd. (株式會社大阪鐵工所本社造船所) at the behest of the Ministry of the Army (陸軍省). She was launched on 18 February 1942 and completed on 10 August 1942. She was made of steel and registered in Hiroshima. She was fitted as a rescue tug. She was struck from the Navy List on 12 November 1942.

References

1942 ships
Ships sunk by American submarines
Maritime incidents in November 1942
World War II naval ships of Japan
Tugboats
Marine salvage
Ships built by Osaka Iron Works